In addition to the archetypical mad scientist, there are fictional characters of scientists and engineers who go above and beyond the regular demands of their professions to use their skills and knowledge for the betterment of others, often at great personal risk. In this list of fictional scientists and engineers, an annotated alphabetical overview is given of notable characters in this category.

In literature
 Bertrand Zobrist
 Professor Shonku (Byomjatrir Diary, Professor Shonku o Robu, Professor Shonku o Khoka, Professor Shonku o Corvus, Ek Sringo Obhijaan, Swarnaparni and many more by the legendary Satyajit Ray) – world's most respected scientist, inventor and Physics professor in Scottish Church College. He had a bunch of incredible inventions and a series of adventures which he had written in his diary.
 Martin Arrowsmith (Arrowsmith)
 Dr. Claire Deller (I, Robot and other stories by Isaac Asimov) – chief robot genius of San Diego Robots and Mechanical Men
 Joseph Cavor (The First Men in the Moon) – inventor of the "Cavorite" anti-gravity material
 Captain Hagbard Celine (Illuminatus trilogy) – fights the Illuminati from his submarine and with his computer, both designed by himself
 Norma Cenva (Legends of Dune) – inventor of the space folding engine
 Captain Jaylen Cresida (The Lost Fleet) – captain in the Alliance Navy under the command of Captain John "Black Jack" Geary, and an expert on hypernet gates.
 Leonid Gorbovsky (Noon Universe) – genius scientist, progressor and spaceship captain who is known for his ability to land on even the most dangerous planets, to survive planet-wide catastrophes and easily making contact with any non-human civilization
 Leo Graf (Falling Free) – space engineer who leads a group of genetically engineered four-armed humans known as "quaddies" to freedom
 Otto Hantzen (Les Mystères de Demain from Paul Féval, fils and H. J. Magog) – German mad scientist, with female accomplice Hindu mystic Yogha, battles his former colleague Oronius from Mount Everest to Atlantis
 William Harper "Johnny" Littlejohn (Doc Savage) – archaeologist, associate of Doc Savage
 Gennady Komov (Noon Universe) – xenopsychologist whose main occupation is engaging contact with and studying alien (especially, non-human) civilizations
 Pardot Kynes (Prelude to Dune) – planetologist
 Liet-Kynes (Prelude to Dune and Dune) – planetologist
 Lt. Col Andrew Blodgett "Monk" Mayfair (Doc Savage) – chemist, associate of Doc Savage
 Dr. Morel (The Invention of Morel) – invented a machine that records and reproduces reality
 Captain Nemo (Twenty Thousand Leagues Under the Sea, The Mysterious Island) – ambiguous-to-villainous figure, who later took on a heroic role
 Leonard of Quirm (Discworld) – super-intelligent clockpunk engineer
 Col John "Renny" Renwick (Doc Savage) – civil engineer, associate of Doc Savage
 Maj Thomas J. "Long Tom" Roberts (Doc Savage) – electrical engineer, associate of Doc Savage
 Dr. Clark Savage, Jr., a.k.a. Doc Savage (Doc Savage) – surgeon, scientist, adventurer, inventor, explorer and musician
 Arne Saknussemm (Journey to the Center of the Earth) – 16th-century Icelandic naturalist, alchemist, and traveler whose messages guide a group of 19th-century adventurers 
 Hari Seldon (Foundation Series) – mathematician who invents psychohistory
 Cyrus Smith (The Mysterious Island) – great literary example of a 19th-century engineer
 Dr. Phineas Waldolf Steel – roboticist, transhumanist and industrial/steampunk musician
 Franny K. Stein – child scientist who frequently invents monsters to combat various danger
 Tom Swift and Tom Swift, Jr. (children's stories) – father-and-son team of inventors
 Crawford Tillinghast (short story "From Beyond") – inventor of a machine which allows perception of normally imperceptible things
 Professor Abraham Van Helsing (Dracula) – nemesis of Bram Stoker's Dracula; in later incarnations, the professor has not fared so well, and, in some adaptations, is himself a villain
 Other Mother (Coraline)
Mark Watney (The Martian (Weir novel)) – botanist, mechanical engineer, astronaut

Mad scientists and evil geniuses
 Victor Frankenstein (novel Frankenstein by Mary Shelley; Frankenstein film as "Heinrich Von Frankenstein") – scientist who stole body parts from graves and used them to create an undead monster
 Dr. Henry Jekyll (Strange Case of Dr Jekyll and Mr Hyde) – scientist who searches for alteration of the human body and to separate the evil from the good
 Mad scientists of Stanisław Lem, quite a few mad geniuses, many of whom strove to "inflict social panacea on entire populations", a part of Lem's philosophical analysis of social engineering.
 Dr. Moreau (The Island of Doctor Moreau) – vivisectionist who has fled scandal to live on a remote island in the Pacific to pursue his research of perfecting his Beast Folk
 Professor Moriarty – evil genius antagonist of Sherlock Holmes
 Dr. Julius No (Dr. No)

In live-action films

Individual scientist/engineers
 Eleanor Arroway (Contact) – scientist who searches for extraterrestrial intelligence
 Buckaroo Banzai (The Adventures of Buckaroo Banzai Across the 8th Dimension) – particle physicist, neurosurgeon, test pilot, martial artist and rock star
 Professor Barnhardt (The Day the Earth Stood Still) – American scientist who organizes a scientific reception for Klaatu's message of peace
 Dr. Glenn Barton (The Man and the Challenge) – human-factors scientist
 Professor Gerard Beckert (Frostbite) – geneticist and Nazi World War II veteran creating genetically enhanced vampires out of the unsuspecting youth of a Norrland-town located above the Arctic Circle
 Blankman (Blankman) – science whiz-nerd who believes he is a superhero, and becomes one
 Dr. Emmett Brown, aka Doc Brown (Back to the Future, Back to the Future Part II, and Back to the Future Part III) – inventor of the Flux Capacitor which makes time travel possible
 Seth Brundle (The Fly) – eccentric but brilliant physicist who invented the telepods, machines capable of teleportation
 Sebastian Caine
 Dr. Miles Bennett Dyson (Terminator 2: Judgment Day) – when he learns of the destructive destiny of his future creation, Dyson destroys his research
 Dr. Stephen Falken (WarGames) – creator of the "Joshua" computer program
 Dr. Charles Forbin (Colossus: The Forbin Project) – designer of Colossus
 Dr. Clayton Forrester (The War of the Worlds)
 Dr. Frederick Frankenstein (Young Frankenstein) – the descendant of Dr. Victor Frankenstein 
 Dr. Victor Frankenstein (Frankenstein; or, The Modern Prometheus by Mary Shelley, and films based on the novel) – creates a creature and gives it life
 Kaywinnet Lee Frye (Serenity) – mechanical engineer
 John Kramer (Saw franchise) – a former civil engineer who spends the last months of his life testing people's will to live by kidnapping and placing them in potentially deadly traps
 Dr. Leslie Gaskell (Kronos) – came up with a way to destroy the giant machine
 Richard Hannay (The Thirty-Nine Steps and Greenmantle) – British mining engineer who is the hero in John Buchan's World War I-era adventure novels; The Thirty-Nine Steps has been adapted for film three times 
 Dr. Stanley Goodspeed (The Rock) – FBI chemical weapons specialist
 Corporal Hardin (Southern Comfort (1981 film)) – chemical engineer in regular life on weekend maneuvers with Louisiana Army National Guard squad in rural bayou country as they antagonize some local Cajun people and become hunted. His day job is only relevant to explain his rational sensible approach.
 Professor Eddie Jessup (Altered States) – heroic at the end
 Indiana Jones (Indiana Jones movies and TV shows) – adventurous archaeologist
 David Levinson (Independence Day) – cable-TV engineer who devises the trick that blocks the alien invasion
 der Leitende - LI (das Boot) - chief engineer of U-96 portrayed by Klaus Wennemann after real-life chief engineer Friedrich (Fritz) Grade
 Dr. Emilio Lizardo (The Adventures of Buckaroo Banzai Across the 8th Dimension) – physicist whose mind is under control of the Black Lectroid, Lord John Whorfin
 Ian Malcolm (Jurassic Park) – mathematician and chaotician surviving numerous encounters with dinosaurs and other hazards; his mathematical prowess does not help so much as allow him to predict his own fate, and that of the park's inhabitants
 Dr. Russell A. Marvin (Earth vs. the Flying Saucers) – invented the weapon that brought down the saucers
 Leonora Orantes (Contagion) – World Health Organization epidemiologist
 Q (James Bond) – makes all the gadgets 007 uses; Q is most often portrayed using the conventional literary trappings of a scientist (such as a white lab coat), even though his activities are closer to engineering
 Hank Rearden (Atlas Shrugged) – metallurgist and railroad magnate, inventor of "Rearden metal"
 David Reed (Creature from the Black Lagoon) – contrasted to Mark Williams, a hypermasculine and ultimately destructive scientist
 Ellen Ripley (Alien/Aliens) – engineer aboard the star ship Nostromo
 Menlo Schwartzer (Surf II: The End of the Trilogy) – reputedly brilliant chemist
 Dr. Daisuke Serizawa (Gojira/Godzilla) – scientist who invents the Oxygen Destroyer, uses it to destroy Godzilla, then destroys his notes and sacrifices his own life so his creation can never be misused
 Dr. Jeffrey Stewart (The Magnetic Monster) – personally destroyed the dangerous substance
 Dr. Thomas Stockmann (An Enemy of the People)
 Dr. Ryan Stone (Gravity) – biomedical engineer at a hospital in Lake Zurich; later becomes a mission specialist at NASA
 Dr. Jane Tiptree (Carnosaur) – plans to recreate dinosaurs and destroy humanity
 Professor Wayne Szalinski (Honey, I Shrunk the Kids)
 Dr. William Weir (Event Horizon) – designer of the titular spacecraft and its FTL propulsion system, the "gravity drive"
 Steve Zissou (The Life Aquatic with Steve Zissou (2004 film)) – eccentric oceanographer who sets out to exact revenge on the "jaguar shark"
 John Koestler (Knowing) – astrophysicist at Massachusetts Institute of Technology. Killed at the end of the movie when the massive solar flare destroys and ignites Earth.
 Adrian Helmsley (2012) – geologist, chief science advisor to U.S. President Thomas Wilson
 Charlie Frost, (2012) – fringe science conspiracy theorist and radio talk-show host. Killed in the scene where Yellowstone Caldera erupted
 Jackson Curtis, (2012) – struggling science-fiction writer
 Satnam Surtani, (2012) – astrophysicist
Dr Newton Geiszler, (Pacific Rim, Pacific Rim Uprising) – K-Science Officer (biologist/research team)
Dr Hermann Gottlieb (Pacific Rim, Pacific Rim Uprising) – K-Science Officer (mathematician/research team)
Dr Robert Bruce Banner (The Incredible Hulk, The Avengers, Avengers: Age of Ultron, Thor: Ragnarok, Avengers: Infinity War, Avengers: Endgame) – renowned scientist with 7 PhDs (focus in gamma radiation)
 Eric Selvig (Thor, The Avengers, Thor:The Dark World, Avengers: Age of Ultron)- Astrophysics, worked with Jane Foster on her Wormhole research, associate of Thor and former partner of Bruce Banner. Latter worked for SHIELD to study Tessaract.
Mark Watney (The Martian (film)) – botanist, mechanical engineer, astronaut

Mad scientists
 Conal Cochran (Halloween III: Season of the Witch) – plans to resurrect macabre aspects of the Gaelic festival Samhain, which he connects to witchcraft
 Nathan Bateman
 Dr. Simon Barnister (Underdog)
 Dr. Ralph Benson (The Mad Doctor of Market Street)
 Mr. Barron
 Dr. Theodore Bohmer (The Ghost of Frankenstein) 
 Dr. Paul Carruthers (The Devil Bat)
 Dr. Phillip Channard
 Dr. Franz Edelmann (House of Dracula) – honourable doctor, until he was transfused with the blood of Count Dracula; he then went insane and became a murderer
 Dr. Evil (Austin Powers)
 Dr. Finkelstein (The Nightmare Before Christmas)
 Casanova Frankenstein (Mystery Men)
 Frederick Frankenstein (Young Frankenstein) – grandson of Victor Frankenstein, who at first is so embarrassed by his grandfather's deeds that he insists his name is pronounced "Fronkensteen," but eventually creates his own monster, equipped with an "enormous" Schwanzstücker.
 Dr. Frank N. Furter (The Rocky Horror Picture Show)
 Dr. Gogol (Mad Love)
 Doctor Gordon (Saw and Saw 3D: The Final Chapter) – uncaring surgeon until he survived a "test" orchestrated by the Jigsaw Killer. After the experience changed his viewpoint on life, Gordon became Jigsaw's apprentice and began applying his medical skills to Jigsaw's traps which kidnapped victims were forced to endure. Following Jigsaw's death, Gordon became his successor.
 Dr. Josef Heiter (The Human Centipede (First Sequence)) – Josef Mengele-esque surgeon known for his surgical atrocity he calls the "Human Centipede"
 Dr. Hoenneger (The Wolfman) – German doctor who worked at an insane asylum and used medical torture to "treat" Lawrence Talbot's belief that he transformed into a werewolf every full moon
 Dr. Horrible (Dr. Horrible's Sing-Along Blog)
 Dr. Ashley Kafka (The Amazing Spider-Man 2) – German doctor who experimented on the patients of the Ravencroft Institute for the Criminally Insane
 Dr. Mannering (Frankenstein Meets the Wolf Man) 
 Dr. Wolfe MacFarlane (The Body Snatcher)
 Dr. Cal Meacham (This Island Earth) – earth scientist (a radio engineer in the novel) kidnapped to solve the problem of defending the planet Metaluna
 Dr. Harold Medford (Them!) – led the team that wiped out the giant ants
 Dr. Gustav Niemann (House of Frankenstein) – mad doctor who escaped prison for revenge, took over a horror carnival exhibit that included Count Dracula and later encountered Frankenstein's monster and the Wolf Man
 Philo (UHF)
 Dr. Septimus Pretorius (Bride of Frankenstein) – mad doctor who followed in Henry Frankenstein's footsteps in creating living beings; blackmailed Frankenstein into helping him to create a female companion for Frankenstein's monster
 Rotwang (Metropolis)
 Dr. Shinzo Mafune (Terror of Mechagodzilla) – bitter oceanographer who had previously been ridiculed for his obsessive research into the brain patterns of sea creatures, he allies with the invading Black Hole Planet 3 Aliens, unleashing the mind-controlled kaiju Titanosaurus – whom he had personally discovered – to assist their newly rebuilt Mechagodzilla.
 Dr. Carl Stoner (Sssssss) - delusional scientist attempting to create a method of transforming humans into reptiles
 Dr. Strangelove (film of the same name) – former Nazi scientist who was the scientific advisor to the President of the United States during the brink of apocalypse
 Dr. Alexander Thorkel (Dr. Cyclops)
 Dr. Sy N. Tist (The Mad Scientist, fhe 1988)
 Dr. Richard Vollin (The Raven)
 Dr. Eric Vornoff (Bride of the Monster)
 Dr. Herbert West (Herbert West–Reanimator and Re-Animator)
 Dr. Henry Wu (Jurassic Park, Jurassic World, and Jurassic World: Fallen Kingdom)
 Peter Weyland
 Dr. XXX (The Mad Doctor animated film)
 Dr. Golden Glory (The 5th Monkey) - deranged but brilliant Brazilian scientist who repeatedly attempts to torture monkeys in the hopes of discovering the cure for autism
 Dr. Nick Laslowicz (The Centrifuge Brain Project)

In live-action television

Individual scientist/engineers
 Reginald Barclay (Star Trek: The Next Generation and Star Trek: Voyager) – diagnostic technician transferred to the USS Enterprise-D who later played a key role in a later project which enabled regular contact with the missing Starfleet ship, USS Voyager
 Janos Bartok (Legend) – Hungarian scientist and inventor
 Chuck Bartowski (Chuck) – nerd who uses his skills to save the day many times
 Julian Bashir (Star Trek: Deep Space Nine) – chief medical officer on Deep Space Nine
 Beaker (The Muppet Show) – assistant scientist at Muppet Labs.
 Beakman (Beakman's World) – a general scientist who, in a funny and entertaining manner, teaches that science is a fact of life
 Walter White (Breaking Bad) – a former chemist who, after getting diagnosed with terminal lung cancer, starts manufacturing meth to provide for his family
 Carson Beckett (Stargate Atlantis) – medical doctor and geneticist who discovers the ATA gene and serves as the chief medical officer for the Atlantis expedition
 Sam Beckett (Quantum Leap) – Nobel-prize winning quantum physicist (with multiple doctorates) caught in his own time-travel experiment; "leaping" into many lives along the span of his own lifetime, he must change the histories of those around him for the better before he can return home
 Dr. Walter Bishop (Fringe) – genius and literally mad scientist; responsible for opening a doorway into another universe in order to save an alternate version of his son Peter from dying; his actions resulted in the gradual breakdown of both universes and inadvertently started a war between them
 Brains (Thunderbirds) – engineer
 Lieutenant Colonel Samantha Carter, Ph.D. (Stargate SG-1) – United States Air Force officer and astrophysicist whose scientific knowledge and engineering skills are used to resolve various threats to her team and to Earth
 Ravi Chakrabarti (iZombie) – medical examiner for the Seattle PD. He has studied the unique biology of zombies and has made several attempts to develop a cure for the condition.
 Dr. Sheldon Cooper (The Big Bang Theory) – theoretical physicist at Caltech
 Professor Monty Corndog (The Aquabats / The Aquabats! Super Show!) – eccentric scientist and inventor whose chemical creations turned a group of ordinary men into superhero rock musicians who fight crime with the aide of The Professor's gadgets and contraptions
 Zefram Cochrane (Star Trek: The Original Series and Star Trek: First Contact) – inventor of the warp drive
 Beverly Crusher (Star Trek: The Next Generation) – chief medical officer of the Enterprise-D
 Data (Star Trek: The Next Generation) – second officer and chief operations officer of the Enterprise-D, but his duties covered that of a science officer
 Bill Davis (Family Affair) – civil engineer
 Davros (Doctor Who) – Universal Genius from the planet Skaro and nemesis from the Doctor, he invented the Reality Bomb – a moon sized machine which creates a wavelength with the ability to cancel the electrical field that holds atoms together, he intended to use it to destroy all life in his own, and all other Universes in existence
 Jadzia Dax (Star Trek: Deep Space Nine) – science officer on Deep Space Nine
 Ezri Dax (Star Trek: Deep Space Nine) – counselor on Deep Space Nine
 Dr. Richard Daystrom ("The Ultimate Computer") (Star Trek: The Original Series) – inventor of the duotronic computer systems, the basic principles behind the computers on all Starfleet vessels
 Dr. Linda Denman (H2O: Just Add Water)
 The Doctor (Doctor Who) – super-intelligent alien who was educated as a scientist and uses his skills extensively in his adventures
 The Doctor (Star Trek: Voyager) – Voyagers Emergency Medical Hologram
 Stephen "Steve" Douglas (My Three Sons) – aeronautical engineer
 Dr. Amy Farrah Fowler (The Big Bang Theory) – neurobiologist; played by real-life neuroscientist Mayim Bialik
 Professor Sydney Fox (Relic Hunter) – archaeologist
 Stephen Franklin (Babylon 5 and Crusade)
 Kaywinnet Lee Frye (Firefly) – mechanical engineer
 Dr. Goodfellow (Buck Rogers in the 25th Century)
 Dr. Ross Geller (Friends) – Paleontologist working at a museum in research and administration. Lecturer/Professor at NYU
 Artemus Gordon (The Wild Wild West) – brainy complement to James West's brawn
 Max Hamilton  (H2O: Just Add Water)
 Professor Roy Hinkley, a.k.a. The Professor (Gilligan's Island) – respected de facto leader of the castaways and usually represents the only real continual hope of rescue
 Dr. Leonard Hofstadter (The Big Bang Theory) – experimental physicist at Caltech
 Dr. Bunsen Honeydew (The Muppet Show) – scientist and founder of Muppet Labs.
  Paige Howard (Zoey 101) 
 Dr. Elias Huer (Buck Rogers) – chief scientist and inventor in the comic strip, movie serial and television series
 Dr. Daniel Jackson (Stargate and Stargate SG-1) – archaeologist and linguist who figures out how to open the Stargate; his understanding of cultures and languages typically comes in handy when dealing with the bewildering array of cultures in the Stargate universe
 Jimmy the Robot (The Aquabats / The Aquabats! Super Show!) – android with advanced skills and knowledge in numerous areas of science and technology
 Dr. Rajesh Koothrappali (The Big Bang Theory) – astrophysicist at Caltech
 Geordi La Forge (Star Trek: The Next Generation) – chief engineering officer of the Enterprise-D
 Angus "Mac" MacGyver (MacGyver) – secret agent who fights the forces of evil using his scientific and engineering knowledge to his advantage
 Quinn Mallory (Sliders) – graduate student who invents the transdimensional gateway
 Lewis McCartney (H2O: Just Add Water)
 Leonard McCoy (Star Trek: The Original Series) – chief medical officer of the Enterprise
 Dr. Rodney McKay (Stargate SG-1 and Stargate Atlantis) – brilliant but whiny astrophysicist who manages to save the lost city of Atlantis on a regular basis (and never lets anyone forget it)
 Miles O'Brien (Star Trek: Deep Space 9) – chief operations officer on Deep Space Nine, which doubles as a chief engineer
 Walter O'Brien – 197 IQ genius, hacker, and leader of team Scorpion
 Dr. Juliet Parrish (V) – scientist who becomes the principal leader of the resistance against the genocidal alien Visitors
 Quinn Pensky (Zoey 101) – 13-year-old mad scientist, best known for her "Quinventions"
 Phlox (Star Trek: Enterprise) – chief medical officer on the Enterprise-NX01
 Professor Bernard Quatermass (various TV series and movies)
 Dr. Bernadette Rostenkowski-Wolowitz (The Big Bang Theory) – microbiologist for a pharmaceutical company
 Hoshi Sato (Star Trek: Enterprise) – communication officer of the Enterprise-NX01 and inventor of the universal translator
 Abby Sciuto (NCIS) – forensic scientist for the Naval Criminal Investigative Service
 Montgomery Scott, a.k.a. Scotty (Star Trek: The Original Series) – chief engineer of the Enterprise, often described as a miracle worker
 Dr. Richard Seaton (Skylark) – super-scientist
 Seven of Nine (Star Trek: Voyager) – Borg drone with no official rank or post, but due to her access to advanced Borg knowledge, she was used as an acting science officer on Voyager
 Dr. River Song (Doctor Who) – archeologist, adventurer, and companion of the Doctor
 Noonien Soong (Star Trek: The Next Generation) – inventor of the positronic brain, which makes intelligent androids possible
 Dr. Tolian Soran (Star Trek Generations) – El-Aurian scientist desperate to return to the Nexus
 Mr. Spock (Star Trek: The Original Series) – science officer and second-in-command of the Enterprise
 Dr. Mohinder Suresh (Heroes) – professor of genetics and parapsychology from India
 B'Elanna Torres (Star Trek: Voyager) – chief engineer of Voyager
 T'Pol (Star Trek: Enterprise) – second-in-command of the Enterprise-NX01, though the crew relied on her as an acting science officer as well
 Charles Tucker III, a.k.a. "Trip" (Star Trek: Enterprise) – chief engineer of the Enterprise-NX01
 Mrs. Wakeman (My Life as a Teenage Robot) – XJ-9's creator
 Dr. Rudy Wells (novel Cyborg by Martin Caidin; The Six Million Dollar Man, The Bionic Woman) – cyberneticist
 Howard Wolowitz (The Big Bang Theory) – aerospace engineer at Caltech
 Dr. Horace Goodspeed, (Lost) – mathematician 
 Dr. Pierre Chang, (Lost) – astrophysicist

Mad scientists
 Davros (Doctor Who) - the creator of the Daleks. 
 Dr. Arthur Arden, a.k.a. Hans Grüper (American Horror Story: Asylum)
 Walter Bishop (Fringe)
 Martin Brenner
 The Dollmaker (Arrow, Gotham, Batman vs. Robin, and DC Comics) – serial killer and insane surgeon who makes dolls out of human flesh
 Dr. Laurence Erhardt (Mystery Science Theater 3000)
 Dr. Clayton Forrester (Mystery Science Theater 3000)
 Kinga Forrester (Mystery Science Theater 3000)
 Pearl Forrester (Mystery Science Theater 3000)
 Dr. Benjamin Jeffcoat (My Secret Identity)
 Masahiko Minami
 Dr. Loveless (The Wild Wild West)
 TV's Frank (Mystery Science Theater 3000)
 The Master (Doctor Who) - a renegade alien who seeks universal conquest.
Dr. Jonathan Reiss (Lara Croft Tomb Raider: The Cradle of Life)
Professor Roy Curien (House of the Dead 2)

In television animation
 Dr. Namba (Pokémon) – evil scientist who works for Team Rocket.
 Vlad Plasmius (Danny Phantom) – half-ghost evil inventor 
 Marvin the Martian (Looney Tunes) – would-be planet conqueror 
 Miles Dredd (Max Steel) – main antagonist
 Megatron (Transformers) – leader of the Decepticons nemesis of Optimus Prime and the Autobots. 
 Twilight Sparkle (My Little Pony: Friendship is Magic)
 Mametchi - (Tamagotchi) 
 Princess Bubblegum (Adventure Time) – beautiful princess who invents and creates the citizens of Candy Kingdom in the land of Ooo
 Princess Entrapta (She-Ra: Princess of Power and She-Ra and the Princesses of Power) robotics engineer and inventor
 Professor Bug (The Backyardigans) – pseudo-steampunk mad scientist portrayed by Pablo who bugs all the robots in Mega City
 Professor Frink (The Simpsons) – Springfield's greatest scientific and engineering mind
 Newton Gimmick (The Adventures of Teddy Ruxpin) – absent-minded inventor whose inventions do not always work, but who always comes through in the end
 Gadget Hackwrench (Chip 'n Dale Rescue Rangers) – mouse tinkerer/scientist
 Franz Hopper (Code Lyoko) – genius in quantum physics and computer programming responsible for the creation of the virtual reality Lyoko, malevolent AI XANA and the advanced hardware that support both
 Van Kleiss (Generator Rex) – main antagonist
 Kowalski (Penguins of Madagascar) – team's scientist and inventor 
 Doctor Krieger (Archer TV series) – head of the ISIS applied research department
 Professor Membrane (Invader Zim) – super-scientist; "the man without whom this world falls into chaos, and the inventor of Super Toast"
 Doctor Mindbender (G.I. Joe: Renegades) – mad young genius in charge of Cobra's secret Bio-Viper project
 Sandy Cheeks (SpongeBob SquarePants) - major character, one of Spongebob's best friends.
 Jimmy Neutron (The Adventures of Jimmy Neutron: Boy Genius) – boy genius
 Perceptor (Transformers) – Autobot scientist
 Peridot (Steven Universe) – gem scientist and guardian of the crystal gems
 Stanford "Ford" Pines (Gravity Falls) – author of the three journals and earned his Ph.D. in Backupsmore University
 Dr. Benton Quest (Jonny Quest)
Sokka (Avatar: The Last Airbender) – self-taught engineer, inventor, and military strategist
 Asami Sato (The Legend of Korra) – trained engineer, skilled pilot and driver, and competent unarmed combatant; partner of Avatar Korra and CEO of Future Industries
 Ratchet (Transformers series) – skilled Autobot medic; in the G1 Comics, he sacrifices himself to kill Megatron
 Professor Utonium (Powerpuff Girls) – father/scientist who created the Powerpuff Girls, among several other wacky things
Dr. Thaddeus "Rusty" Venture (The Venture Bros.) – self proclaimed super-scientist who primarily re-purposes his father Jonas Venture's old inventions. Parody of Dr. Benton Quest
 Wheeljack (Transformers) – Autobot engineer and inventor
 Doctor Zoidberg (Futurama) – lobster-like creature working as the company doctor for Planet Express
 Aviva Corcovado (Wild Kratts) – engineer and inventor
 Dr. Claw (Inspector Gadget series)
 Dr. Arkeville (The Transformers TV series) – self-proclaimed evil genius who allies himself with the Decepticons
 Professor Bug (The Backyardigans) – pseudo-steampunk mad scientist portrayed by Pablo who bugs all the robots in Mega City
 Professor Finbarr Calamitous (The Adventures of Jimmy Neutron: Boy Genius) 
 Dexter (Dexter's Laboratory) – child genius who whips up dazzling, world-saving inventions in his secret laboratory
 Mandark (Dexter's Laboratory) – Dexter's rival, an evil genius who wants to destroy Dexter's laboratory and take over the world
 Dr. Heinz Doofenshmirtz (Phineas & Ferb) – mad scientist whose goal is to take over the tri-state area
 Dr. Drakken (Kim Possible) – blue-skinned mad scientist determined to take over the world in order to prove his genius
 Professor Hubert Farnsworth (Futurama) – creator of an atomic monster, various inventions, and the engines that allow space travel
 Dr. Fritz Huhnmorder (Robot Chicken) – scientist who revives a road-killed chicken with cybernetic technology and forces the chicken to watch various stop motion comedy sketches
 Hange Zoe (Attack on Titan) – quirky scientist in charge of studying titans and inventing new weapons for the Survey Corps.
 Mane-iac (My Little Pony: Friendship Is Magic) – mad scientist in chemical engineering, specializing in the production of detergents
 Dr. Alphonse Mephesto (South Park) – mad scientist who specializes in genetic engineering; creates strange creatures with his talents; also performs experiments ranging from simple DNA tests to creating a genetic clone of Stan Marsh for his son's science project
 Lisa Loud (The Loud House)
 Mojo Jojo (Powerpuff Girls) – mad scientist's chimpanzee that plots to take over the world and destroy the Powerpuff Girls; he was also Professor Utonium's former pet and partially responsible for the creation of the Powerpuff Girls 
 Plankton (SpongeBob SquarePants) – evil genius who specializes in building robotic inventions, including his sidekick Karen
 Rick Sanchez (Rick and Morty) – sociopathic, alcoholic but the smartest man of the universe who travels various dimensions with his grandson Morty.
 Dr. Weird (Aqua Teen Hunger Force) – smartest, madest, and scientistest scientist in the universe whose experiments often cause problems for the Aqua Teens.
 Jack Spicer (Xiaolin Showdown) – evil boy genius
 Dr. Cinnamon J Scudworth (Clone High) - A mad scientist who created all the clones of historic figures, employed by The Secret Board of Shadowy Figures
 Professor Venomous (OK K.O.! Let's Be Heroes) – international terrorist and evil inventor 
 Lord Boxman (OK K.O.! Let's Be Heroes) – evil robotics engineer and CEO of Boxmore.
 Dr. Flug (Villainous) - An intelligent and inventive mad scientist who creates all the gadgets and machines that Black Hat attempts to sell.
 Dr. Anton Sevarius (Gargoyles) - mad scientist, geneticist involved in several projects in the Gargoyles storyline. His most notable act is the creation of Talon and the Mutates.
 Susan and Mary Test (Johnnt Test) - twin sisters who develop all sorts of gadgets and chemicals, usually tested by Johnny with unexpected results.
 Dr. Cerebral (Atomic Betty) -  a mad alien scientist, consisting of a brain with a face floating within a glass tank upon a mechanical body who seeks to control the universe and wipe out all organics due to a belief mechanical beings be more efficient.
 Hugo A-Go-Go (Batfink) - Batfink's most recurring enemy.
 Professor Porter (The Legend of Tarzan)
 Alador Blight (The Owl House) - a workaholic engineer that uses a mixture of witchcraft and technology in order to craft weapons and mechanical bodyguards.

In animated films
 Megamind (Megamind)
 * Professor Porter (Tarzan (1999 film))
 Mametchi - (Tamagotchi: The Movie)
 Twilight Sparkle (My Little Pony: The Movie, 2017)
 Dr. Cockroach (Monsters vs. Aliens) – brilliant professor and a mad scientist with the head, body and abilities of a cockroach
 Gru (Despicable Me)
 Dr. Jumba Jookiba (Lilo & Stitch, 2002)
Buddy Pine a. k. a. Syndrome (The Incredibles, 2004) - Mr. Incredible's fan-turned-supervillain, who uses his scientific prowess to give himself enhanced abilities.
 Dr. Nefario (Despicable Me)
 Victor "Vector" Perkins (Despicable Me)
 Dr. Albert W. Wily (Mega Man)
 Mac (Chicken Run)- Scottish Chicken Scientist, helps other chickens escape the farm using aerodynamics, anatomy, mechanics.

In comics and graphic novels

DC Comics 
 Barry Allen, a.k.a. The Flash (The Flash) – police scientist and superhero
 Querl Dox, a.k.a. Brainiac 5 (Legion of Super-Heroes) –  reputed to have a brain exponentially more powerful than a normal human
 Jay Garrick, a.k.a. The Flash (The Flash) – research scientist, superhero and founding member of the Justice Society of America
 Dr. Pamela Lillian Isley, a.k.a. Poison Ivy (Batman) – supervillain scientist with an affinity towards poisonous plant.
 Ted Knight, a.k.a. Starman (Starman) – astronomer, expert scientist and superhero
 Dr. Jon Osterman, a.k.a. Dr. Manhattan (Watchmen) – nuclear physicist transformed by accident into a godlike super-being; while publicized as a superhero, he functions as the ultimate weapon for the United States military
 Ray Palmer, a.k.a. Atom (The Atom) – professor of physics at Ivy University; able to shrink his body to varying degrees, even to sub-atomic level, and able to alter his mass to near infinite levels
 Doctor Poison (Wonder Woman) – DC Comics supervillain, a mad scientist who specializes in chemistry and poisons
 Alan Scott (Green Lantern) – engineer and the first Green Lantern
 Doctor Sivana, full name Thaddeus Bodog Sivana – world's wickedest scientist; arch-enemy of Captain Marvel (DC Comics)
 Angela Spica, a.k.a. Engineer II (The Authority)
 Tom Strong (Tom Strong) – science hero
 Bruce Wayne, a.k.a. Batman (Detective Comics, Batman) – world's greatest detective (reputedly), with incredible scientific knowledge and forensic and memory skills that are second to none
 Carter Hall, a.k.a. Hawkman (Hawkman) – archaeologist who has been reborn many times, using his knowledge acquired through centuries to aid him on his anthropological studies

Mad scientists
 Carter/The Wizard (Batman and Robin)
 Anti-Monitor
 Mr. Freeze
 Man-Bat
 Orca
 Ultra-Humanite
 Gorilla Grodd
 T. O. Morrow
 Professor Ivo – DC Comics supervillain, creator of Amazo and obsessed with immortality
 Dr. Tito Daka (Batman) 
 Doctor Death (DC Comics) – first super-villain Batman ever faces, Doctor Death is a chemist and producer of biological weapons
 Lex Luthor (Superman films and DC Comics) – scientific genius and corrupt businessman who is the nemesis of Superman
 Professor Hugo Strange (DC Comics)

Marvel Comics 
 Dr. Bruce Banner, a.k.a. The Incredible Hulk (Hulk) – scientist who developed the "Gamma Bomb" for the US government; an accident at the site of a test led to his becoming the Hulk; for a long period after, while in the form of Bruce Banner, he looked for scientific ways to rid himself of the transformation
 Forge (X-Men) – mutant engineering genius
 Dr. Henry (Hank) Philip McCoy, a.k.a. Beast (X-Men) – world-renowned biochemist and mutant superhero
 Peter Parker, a.k.a. Spider-Man (Spider-Man) – superhero with great knowledge of advanced sciences; now teaches at the high school he formerly attended. His father Richard has also been portrayed as a scientist and geneticist in the Ultimate Marvel comics as well as the films The Amazing Spider-Man and its sequel.
 Reed Richards, a.k.a. Mister Fantastic (Fantastic Four) – scientist and inventor, regarded as one of the most intelligent people on Earth, leader of the Fantastic Four
 Ted Sallis –  duplicator of the serum that created Captain America; transformed into The Man-Thing;although he had serious problems with his personal ethics when it came to women and girls, he abandoned Operation Sulfer on moral grounds, and elected to remain as Man-Thing rather than allow innocents to be killed by the demon Thog
 Tony Stark, a.k.a. Iron Man (Iron Man) – industrialist and mechanical engineer of incredible ingenuity and inventive genius, whose technology to fight crime keeps him alive as well; he suffers from alcoholism
 Victor and Janet Stein (Runaways) – founding members of the Pride; parents of Chase Stein
 Victor Von Doom, a.k.a. Doctor Doom (Doctor Doom) – evil scientist, engineer, genius, conqueror; like Mister Fantastic, he is regarded as one of the most intelligent people on Earth, even though he is a villain
 Professor Charles Francis Xavier, a.k.a. Professor X (X-Men) – founder, mentor, and sometime leader of the X-Men
Dr. Henry "Hank" Pym biochemist, discovers an unusual set of subatomic particles he labels "Pym particles". Entrapping these within two separate serums, he creates a size-altering formula and a reversal formula, testing them on himself. Becomes original Ant-Man.

Mad scientists
 Curt Connors – college professor who created a formula to regrow his missing arm; turning himself into "The Lizard"
 Dr. Cyrus Maldor/The Scarab (Captain America)
 Otto Gunther Octavius, a.k.a. Doctor Octopus (Spider-Man 2 and Marvel Comics) – narcissistic roboticist and nuclear physicist who was fused to his four mechanical tentacles; has a vendetta against Spider-Man
Miles Warren a.k.a. Jackal - a college professor who has a vendetta against Spider-Man due to the death of his girlfriend Gwen Stacy, whom he secretly loved, created multiple clones of the hero as well as a clone of Gwen herself to attack and torment him and eventually turning himself into a beast. 
Norman Osborn a.k.a. Green Goblin (Spider-Man and Marvel Comics) - billionaire CEO of Oscorp who is at times portrayed as a scientist with brilliant intellect and who crafts a halloween themed costume. Spider-Man's nemesis. 
 Dr. Arnim Zola (Captain America films and Marvel Comics) – former Nazi scientist who escaped death by transferring his consciousness into a mechanical body; in the present day, he is a member of the HYDRA terrorist organization
 Il Dottore from Genshin Impact (introduced in the webtoon) – a harbinger and scientist, known for his unethical experiments on children and co-workers.
 Morbius
 Heinrich Zemo, also known as Baron Zemo
 Mandarin
 Kang the Conqueror
 Leader
 MODOK
 Bolivar Trask
 Vulture
 Mister Sinister
 Apocalypse

Other
 Adhemar (The Adventures of Nero) – child prodigy; professor in many different disciplines; Nobel Prize laureate; teaches at the university of Oxford and Cambridge
 Professor Barabas  (Suske en Wiske) – expert in many inventions, including time travel
 Professor Cuthbert Calculus (The Adventures of Tintin) – brilliant, if distracted, scientist; responsible for developing the first one-person submarine, the first ultrasonic destruction device, and the first white rose; leader of the first crewed lunar mission. Also very hard of hearing.
 Dilbert – star engineer of the comic strip series Dilbert
 Dilton Doiley (Archie Comics) – teenage inventor and scientific genius
 Donatello (Teenage Mutant Ninja Turtles) – most intelligent of the four Turtles, he builds a lot of advanced devices, often in the heat of battle
 Gyro Gearloose (Donald Duck universe)
 Jeremias Gobelijn (Jommeke) – self-declared "professor in everything"
 Agatha Heterodyne (Airship Entertainment, Girl Genius) – heiress to the political background and scientific understanding of the Heterodyne family
 Professor Kumulus  (Piet Pienter en Bert Bibber)
 Fran Madaraki (Franken Fran) – artificial human created by a biologist; like her creator, she possesses immense medical skills
 Will Magnus (Metal Men) – creator of a team of advanced artificially intelligent robots
 Professor Philip Mortimer (Blake and Mortimer) – main character, physicist and gentleman scholar 
 Helen B. Narbon (Narbonic) – mad geneticist with an odd fascination with gerbils.
Norman Osborn
 Dr. Jonathan Septimus (Blake and Mortimer) – mad scientist vengeful due to perceived slights by his colleagues, appears in The Yellow "M" and The Septimus Wave
 Joachim Sickbock (Tom Poes) – mad scientist who often proves to be a threat to the protagonists
 Professor Snuffel  (Piet Pienter en Bert Bibber)
 Baxter Stockman (Teenage Mutant Ninja Turtles)
 Othar Tryggvassen (Girl Genius) – powerful "spark", or mad scientist, bent on destroying all sparks, including himself
 Ludwig Von Drake (Duck universe) – professor of science and psychology
 Wally – lazy and disillusioned engineer of the comic strip series in the Dilbert universe
 Dr. Hans Zarkov (Flash Gordon)
 Dr. Frankenollie (Mickey Mouse)
Brainstorm (The Transformers: More than Meets the Eye) – scientific genius who invented time travel in order to save his best friend's husband, the consequences of which technically began the Autobot-Decepticon civil war.

In anime and manga

Individual scientist/engineers 
Jotaro Kujo (JoJo's Bizarre Adventure) – marine biologist, while unrelated to his role in the various plot arcs he appears in, Jotaro earns a doctorate in marine biology sometime during the summer of 1999 in the series' original timeline; dolphin and anchor motifs were added to his clothing designs to reflect his new occupation
Lloyd Asplund (Code Geass) – Britannian scientist who designed the Lancelot Knightmare Frame, a bipedal, humanoid superweapon entrusted to Japanese pilot Suzaku Kururugi
 Professor Brown
 Bulma (Dragon Ball) – creator of the Dragon Radar and a time machine allowing Trunks to avert the conquest of the world by evil androids
 Kiranin Colbock (Space Runaway Ideon) – member of a science academy
 Caesar Clown (One Piece) – former marine scientist and former partner of Doctor Vegapunk; he created mass destruction weapons and human experimentation but was fired and arrested due to his unethical research methods
 The Doctor (Hellsing) – lead scientist of Millennium who created the Nazi vampires and the catboy Schrödinger
 Professor Kouzou Fuyutsuki (Neon Genesis Evangelion) – right-hand man to Supreme Commander Gendo Ikari and second in command of Nerv
 Szayelaporro Grantz (Bleach) 
 Heaven Canceller (A Certain Magical Index) – doctor and medical scientist
 Doctor Hogback (One Piece) – doctor of Gecko Moria's crew who modified dead bodies to create a zombie army with the help of his captain
 Ri Kohran (Sakura Wars)
 Jonathan Joestar (JoJo's Bizarre Adventure) – although he was going to be an archaeologist, he never got to actually do it because his blond stepbrother burnt his dog
 Harumi Kiyama (A Certain Scientific Railgun) – creator of the Level Upper
 Dr. Cinnamon (TwinBee) – 	A genius scientist who is the creator of TwinBee and WinBee.
 Dr. Emil Lang (Robotech) – responsible for much of the Earth-based Robotechnology; briefly seen in the original series, he played a much larger role in the aborted series Robotech II: The Sentinels, which was adapted as a comic book series
 Professor Ochanomizu – surrogate father of Osamu Tezuka's Astro Boy
 Manami Okuda (Assassination Classroom)
 Tochiro Oyama (Captain Harlock) – designer and some say the soul of Harlock's spaceship Arcadia
 Dr. Tem Ray (Mobile Suit Gundam) – father of Amuro Ray; led the design team that created the RX-78 Gundam
 Dr. Aki Ross (Final Fantasy: The Spirits Within) – biologist vowing to stop the aliens that plague the Earth
 Shiro Sanada (Star Blazers) – chief technician or chief mechanic of the Space Battleship Yamato, called Sandor in Star Blazers
 Hanji Zoe (Attack on Titan) – head scientist in the survey corps, performs experiments on captured titans hoping to find a new way to save humanity 
 Professor Noriyasu Seta (Love Hina)
 Skuld (Oh My Goddess!) – goddess who has the ability to build robots and machines from scrap material
 James Ray Steam (Steamboy) – boy genius who helps his father and grandfather save Victorian London from a greedy corporation's superweapons
 Precia Testarossa
 Doctor Vegapunk (One Piece) – leading scientist in the employment of the Marines; his work includes discovering the secrets and uses of Seastone as well as the secrets of how Devil Fruit powers work
Wu Tomoki (JoJo's Bizarre Adventure) – orthopedic surgeon and cosmetic dermatologist employed at the T.G. University Hospital, notable for his research of the Rokakaka fruit

Mad scientists
 Kaolla Su (Love Hina) – exchange student who is the princess of the island of Molmol. She frequently invents dangerous devices and wants to turn her kingdom into a technological powerhouse that will conquer Japan.
 Bondrewd (Made in Abyss) – White Whistle of ill repute, "Bondrewd the Novel" is in charge of Idofront, the Cave Riders' forward Operating Base in the fifth layer. He was the one responsible for several unethical experiments on children, including the one which transformed Nanachi and Mitty into Hollows.
 Dr. Hiroshi Agasa (Case Closed) – an absent-minded professor who invents several devices to help out Jimmy Kudo
 Naoko Akagi (Neon Genesis Evangelion)
 Ritsuko Akagi (Neon Genesis Evangelion) – daughter of the above
Mayuri Kurotsuchi (Bleach) – a sadistic and cruel shinigami who uses his position as the leader of the Soul Society's Shinigami Research and Development Institute to conduct his experiments.
 Desty Nova (Battle Angel Alita) – wicked genius whose work is fueled by philosophy; highly skilled at nanotechnology
 Franken Stein (Soul Eater)
Ujiko Daruma (My Hero Academia) – mad scientist associated with the series' main antagonists, League of Villains.
 Orochimaru (Naruto) – a shinobi obsessed with immortality and obtaining knowledge of all jutsu. He conducted many illegal and unethical experiments that resulted in him becoming a wanted criminal.
 Kabuto Yakushi (Naruto) – Orochimaru's assistant who takes part in many of his master's illegal experiments in addition to conducting his own, which include raising the dead.
Dr. Hell (Mazinger Z) - a mad scientist that is obsessed with taking over the world with his army of robotic monsters known as Mechanical Beast or Kikaiju.
Rintaro Okabe (Steins;Gate) - an eccentric yet kind-hearted inventor who embraces the typical image of a mad scientist. His experiments lead to the invention of time travel.

In video games

Scientists 
 Albert Wesker (Resident Evil) – microbiologist working for the pharmaceutical enterprise Umbrella and co-creator of the T-virus; he was killed in the first Resident Evil game by Tyrant T-002, a powerful biological weapon, and was resurrected with super-human powers after self-injecting the T-virus
 Catherine Elizabeth Halsey, MD, PhD (Halo series) – scientist of the Office of Naval Intelligence, best known as the creator of the SPARTAN-II Program and Mjolnir Powered Assault Armor
 Dr. Alphys (Undertale) – stout Lizard monster, and Asgore's royal scientist; extremely timid; the creator of the robot Mettaton and the Amalgamates; has a crush on Undyne, captain of the Royal Guard
 Dr. Andonuts (EarthBound) – father of Jeff, one of the Chosen Four
 Dr. Bosconovitch (Tekken series)
 Cave Johnson (Portal 2) – eccentric former owner of Aperture Science, and creator of the portal gun
 Ciel (Mega Man Zero) – young human scientist who awakens Zero in order to save the world
 Daro'Xen vas Moreh (first appeared in Mass Effect 2) – quarian admiral and scientist who believes that the geth, a synthetic race created by the quarians, who subsequently rebelled and drove their masters from their homeworld, should be controlled by the quarians once again; Admiral Xen also performed surgery on her childhood toys, much to the quarian squadmate Tali'Zorah's disgust
Egon Stetmann (StarCraft II) – creator of the Mecha Swarm, paranoid, and prone to terrazine-induced hallucinations, he was once chief science adviser aboard the Hyperion.
 Professor E. Gadd (Nintendo games)
Coco Bandicoot (Crash Bandicoot) - she is Crash Bandicoot's younger sister.She has a deep intelligence and a love of science, which makes her the opposite of her brother. He is an electronics engineer specializing in hacking, computer programming and machine building
Dr. Gast (Final Fantasy VII) – former head of the Shinra Company's science department; has a much stronger moral compass than his successor
 Dr. Gordon Freeman, Ph.D. (Half-Life) – theoretical physicist who fights a one-man battle against invading aliens, US Marines and Combine forces with a crowbar and other weapons; his associates are Drs. Isaac Kleiner, Eli Vance, Judith Mossman and Arne Magnusson
 Dr. Krieger (Far Cry) – renowned scientist and creator/controller of the Trigens in the first Far Cry game
Kurisu Makise (Steins;Gate) – famous Japanese neuroscientist who lives in the United States, builds a machine that allows the user's memories to be converted into data.
 Dr. Light (Mega Man) – creator of the revolutionary robot Mega Man
 Love Lab scientists (Rhythm Heaven) – male and female scientist pass ingredients to each other to make love potions to the rhythm of the music
 Lucrecia Crescent (Final Fantasy VII) – Shinra scientist and lover of Vincent Valentine
 Grimoire Valentine (Final Fantasy VII) – Shinra scientist and father of Vincent Valentine
 Hojo (Final Fantasy VII) – Head of the Shinra Company's science department; a sociopathic, amoral bioengineer whose experiments drive the game's plot forward
 Mei (Overwatch and Heroes of the Storm) – climatologist, and one of the heroes in both games and comic series
Moira (Overwatch) – geneticist, and one of the playable heroes in the game
 Mordin Solus (first appeared in Mass Effect 2) – member of fictional alien species known as salarians (who have fast metabolisms, talk fast, walk fast and think fast); a brilliant biologist and a tech specialist
 Neuron (City of Heroes)
 Dr. Otto Wolfgang Ort-Meyer (Hitman) – creator of Agent 47 and other clone assassins
Pieter Van Eckhardt (Tomb Rider: The Angel of Darkness)
Plague Knight (Shovel Knight), rouge member of the Order of No Quarter, tries to harvest their Essence for the Ultimate Potion to win over someone's heart.
Reed Wahl (BioShock 2)
 Rikako Asakura (Touhou Project) – titled "Scientist Searching for Dreams", she is one of the few people in Gensokyo to value using science over magic. While she still uses magic in order to enhance her science at times, she tries to refrain from using magic due to a natural distaste of it.
Dr. Samuel Hayden (Doom (franchise)) – Head of the UAC, physicist.
 Tobias Planck (Pirate Galaxy) – named after Max Planck, he is a theoretical physicist and field scientist with a parietal lobe 15% larger than average
 Dr. W.D. Gaster (Undertale) – former royal scientist; only appears a few times while the player visits the CORE; speaks in the Wingdings font
 William Birkin (Resident Evil 2) – microbiologist working for the pharmaceutical enterprise Umbrella Corporation; creator of the G-virus; he was wounded and injected himself with his G-virus, mutating him into a monster
 Dr. Zed (Borderlands) – "Doctor" from the –Borderlands– series
Miles “Tails” Prower (Sonic The Hedgehog)

Mad scientists
 Viktor from League of Legends - scientist who replaced his body with a machine and wants to enhance the human race.
 Dr. Daniel Dickens from Angels of Death - the main character's therapist.
 Dr. Ivo "Eggman" Robotnik (Sonic the Hedgehog) – mad scientist who is the archenemy series' titular hero, Sonic the Hedgehog, specializes in robotics and other fields of engineering, who invents various kinds of aircraft, robots and vehicles in various sizes; he imprisoned animals in the inside of working robotic shells, and experimented with kinds of mutations. He aims to capture the Chaos Emeralds.
 Dr. "Mundo" Edmundo (League of Legends) – sociopath medical doctor who only specializes in one field: the study of the pain response and how to inflict pain;his experiments have caused him to take on a monstrous form reminiscent of Frankenstein's Monster and a deceptively dimwitted speech pattern; out of all the scientists in the game, Dr. Mundo stands out as the only one who is a danger to both himself and others, evident in his self experiments.
 Dr. Muto (video game of the same name).
 Doctor Neo Cortex (Crash Bandicoot) – evil doctor who is the creator and arch-enemy of franchise's titular hero Crash Bandicoot with an oversized head, who has plans to conquer the world, using Power Crystals.
 Doctor Nitrus Brio (Crash Bandicoot) – timid and meek scientist who assisted Doctor Neo Cortex in the first game, often using beakers of chemicals.
 Doctor N. Gin (Crash Bandicoot) – masochistic scientist who assists Neo Cortex in the second game onward.
 Dr. Wily (Mega Man) – primary antagonist of the original Mega Man series.
 Dr. Nefarious (‘’Ratchet and Clank’’) – A recurring adversary to Ratchet, Clank and Captain Qwark.
 GLaDOS/Caroline (Portal) - the main antagonist of the Portal franchise. She was Cave Johnson's assistant, before taking over the facility.
 The Medic (Team Fortress 2) – one of nine playable classes who rejects the Hippocratic Oath. He is able to heal other characters and make them invincible (by using Übercharge) for a limited time with his Medigun. He previously had a medical licence, but lost it due to misplacing a patient's skeleton.
 Vexen/Even (Kingdom Hearts) – A founding member of Organization XIII. A brilliant scientist who carries out research on various Organization projects. He was in charge of the Replica Program at Castle Oblivion, but someone disposed of him.
 Dr. M (Sly Cooper) – He is a mandrill and was the brains of Sly's father's gang he felt he was being held back, so he set up a fortress on Kaine Island to break into the Cooper Vault and claim the wealth.
Professor Monkey-For-A-Head (Earthworm Jim)
Professor Von Kriplespac (Conker's Bad Fur Day)
Rintarō Okabe, a.k.a. Kyōma Hōōin (Steins;Gate) – self proclaimed mad scientist in his Kyōma Hōōin persona (which in reality is taken from a television show he watched as a child).
Yuri (Red Alert 2, and expansion pack) – Soviet psychic and founder of the Psychic Corps. During the Second World War, he took part in Stalin's secret project, whose aim was to create a mind control technology, and army which specialized in psychic warfare.
 Victor Donovan (Dead or Alive) – main antagonist of Dead or Alive series.
 Professor Hojo (Final Fantasy VII) – head of the Shinra Science Research Division. He infused his unborn child Sephiroth with Jenova cells to turn him into a super soldier, and in the present aids Jenova/Sephiroth's plans in the name of scientific research.

Engineers 
 Cid (Final Fantasy) – although there are many different individuals with the name of Cid in many different Final Fantasy games, most of them are some sort of engineer. His existence is a tradition on par with the Chocobo in the series.
 The Engineer (Team Fortress 2) – one of nine playable classes who is capable of building sentry guns for area denial and other constructions which may support other characters
 Isaac Clarke (Dead Space) – space engineer tasked with investigating the U.S.G. Ishimura, and later fighting the Necromorphs
 Otacon (Metal Gear) – designer of Metal Gear REX and ally of Solid Snake
 Rory Swann (StarCraft II) – New Yorker and engineer who runs the mothership of Jim Raynor
 Shion Uzuki (Xenosaga) – "geeky engineer" and "unlikely heroine" who creates KOS-MOS, an "armored gynoid"
 Torbjörn (Overwatch) – Swedish engineer and weapons designer, and a founding member of Overwatch.
 Engineer (Deep Rock Galactic) – Dwarven engineer and employee of the Deep Rock Galactic corporation.

Other
 Dr. Baron von Kluckinstein (The Radioactive Chicken Heads)
Henry Emily (Five Nights at Freddy's) Henry was the creator of the springlock animatronics, and possibly the original four animatronics. He is business partners with William Afton and is the father of Charlie Emily and Sammy Emily.
 Morgus the Magnificent was a horror host of late-night science fiction and horror movies and television shows that originated in the New Orleans, Louisiana market.
 Professor Nebulous (Nebulous) – leader of an eco-troubleshooting team
 Prof. Jocelyn Peabody (Dan Dare) – scientific brains behind many of the team's most inventive ideas

Teams of scientists/engineers
 A team of scientists who investigate a deadly disease in The Andromeda Strain 
 Arcot, Wade and Morey – scientist-inventors in science fiction stories by John W. Campbell
 The Baltimore Gun Club in From the Earth to the Moon – three of its wealthy members (Victor Barbicane, Stuyvesant Nicholl, Ben Sharpe) build a giant gun which launches an occupied capsule to the Moon
 Bunsen and Beaker in The Muppets
 Challengers of the Unknown – four scientific explorers
 Eureka (Eureka) - a hidden-away town in Oregon where everyone, even the young children, are scientific geniuses.
 Forensic scientists who use their skills to solve crimes in CSI: Crime Scene Investigation, CSI: NY and CSI: Miami
 Edward Elric and Alphonse Elric – alchemist brothers who seek the legendary Philosopher's stone, and end up saving their country with their alchemical skills
 Ghostbusters – most of the central characters (Peter Venkman, Raymond Stantz, Egon Spengler and Winston Zeddemore) are parapsychologists who battle ghosts and other supernatural menaces with equipment of their own design
Global Dynamics (Eureka) - a major research facility in the town of Eureka, where most of America's top-secret government experiments are conducted.
 The Kihara family of mad scientists are dedicated to the pursuit of science whatever the cost, in A Certain Magical Index; individual members are often antagonists
 The Last Three of Venus – Venusian scientists, adversaries of Dan Dare
 The League of Extraordinary Gentlemen
 The Lone Gunmen – ardent conspiracy theorists and computer hackers who frequently assist central X-Files characters Mulder and Scully, though they sometimes have their own adventures
 LOVEMUFFIN (League of Villainous Evildoers Maniacally United For Frightening Investments in Naughtiness) – group of evil mad scientists in Phineas and Ferb, including Dr Heinz Doofenshmirtz
 STUDY – group of frustrated young adult scientists acting as antagonists in A Certain Scientific Railgun S
 The Speedwagon Foundation – group consisting of doctors and archaeologists founded by Robert E. O. Speedwagon somewhere between the story arcs of Phantom Blood and Battle Tendency in JoJo's Bizarre Adventure; extremely knowledgeable on Stands, Pillar Men and DIO
 Unorthodox Engineers – misfit bunch of engineers who solve problems of alien technology/weird planets in the future
 The K-science team: Hong Kong Shatterdome (Newton Geiszler and Hermann Gottlieb) – heads of the kaiju science research team (Pacific Rim)

References

External links

Engineers in books and films

 
 
Scientists
Lists of science fiction characters